The "Cartes d'Identité des Tumeurs (CIT)" program, launched and funded by the French charity "Ligue Nationale contre le Cancer," aims to improve or develop better targeted therapeutic approaches by refining molecular knowledge of multiple types of tumors. The CIT program mainly relies on the large-scale and systematic profiling of large cohorts of tumors at various molecular levels including at least the genome, the epigenome, and the transcriptome.

See also 
 Precision medicine
 Oncology
 Cancer Research
 Bioinformatics
 Computational genomics
 Oncogenomics
 Genomics
 Transcriptome
 Gene expression profiling

External links 
 Official web site
 List of main scientific publications

Evidence-based medicine
Medical diagnosis
Bioinformatics
Biostatistics
Cancer research